Ntsikelelo Nyauza (born 10 May 1990) is a South African professional soccer player. He has previously played for Orlando Pirates, as a defender.

Career
Nyauza has played for Platinum Stars, Roses United and Orlando Pirates.

Career statistics

References

1990 births
Living people
South African soccer players
Platinum Stars F.C. players
Roses United F.C. players
Orlando Pirates F.C. players
Association football defenders